Helen Trinca is an Australian journalist and author.

Background 
Trinca was born in Perth and graduated from the city's University of Western Australia with a BA in English and anthropology. She began her career in journalism on The West Australian. She moved to Sydney in 1980.

A former contributor to the Griffith Review and Australasian Business Intelligence, Trinca previously held senior positions at The Sydney Morning Herald.

Writing
Her third book, Madeleine, is a biography of Madeleine St John, who was the first Australian female writer to be shortlisted for the Man Booker Prize in 1997. Trinca's book was a joint winner of the 2014 Prime Minister's Literary Awards.

Bibliography
 Waterfront: The Battle That Changed Australia, (Doubleday (publisher)/Transworld, 2000) co-authored with Anne Davies, 
 Better Than Sex: How A Whole Generation Got Hooked On Work, (Random House Australia, 2004) co-authored with Catherine Fox, 
 Madeleine : a life of Madeleine St John, (Text Publishing Co., 2013)

References

External links
 Helen Trinca on IMDb

Living people
Year of birth missing (living people)
Australian women journalists
Australian journalists
The Sydney Morning Herald people